Bruce A. Wishart is an Australian writer and actor, best known for his work in TV movies for Robert Bruning.

Select credits
The Passionate Pianist (1957) (TV play) - actor only
Off the Beach (1959) (musical revue)
Further Off the Beach (1959) (musical revue)
Late Night Revue (1959) (musical revue)
The Terrific Adventures of the Terrible Ten (1960) (TV series)
Homicide (1970–71) (TV series)
Paradise (1975) (TV movie)
 Is There Anybody There? (1976) (TV movie)
Mama's Gone A-Hunting (1977) (TV movie)
Gone to Ground (1977) (TV movie)
Glenview High (1977) (TV series)
Chopper Squad (1978) (TV movie)
The Newman Shame (1978) (TV movie)
Image of Death (1978) (TV movie)
Plunge Into Darkness (1978) (TV movie) 
Demolition (1978) (TV movie)
Cop Shop (1980) (TV series)

References

External links

Bruce Wishart at Ausstage

Australian screenwriters
Living people
Year of birth missing (living people)